Bianka Schwede (later Borrmann, born 9 January 1953) is a German rower who competed for East Germany in the 1976 Summer Olympics.

She was born in Dresden. In 1976 she was a crew member of the East German boat that won the gold medal in the coxed four event. Under her married name, she travelled as a reserve to the 1978 World Rowing Championships in New Zealand but did not compete.

References

External links 
 

1953 births
Living people
East German female rowers
Olympic rowers of East Germany
Rowers at the 1976 Summer Olympics
Olympic gold medalists for East Germany
Rowers from Dresden
Olympic medalists in rowing
World Rowing Championships medalists for East Germany
Medalists at the 1976 Summer Olympics